Charles M. Jones (1921-2002) was an Alaskan politician representing Alaska's 1st District from January 26, 1959 – January 22, 1961.

Life
Charles was born on December 1, 1921. He died on March 6, 2002, at the age of 80.

Politics
He was Alaska House of Representatives 1st Districts representative form 1959-1961 during the 1st legislature.

References

1921 births
2002 deaths
Democratic Party members of the Alaska House of Representatives
20th-century American politicians